eKalam - International Institute of Professional Training (eKalam Learning, eKalam) which was earlier known as eKalam Institution of E-Learning & Distance Learning/ National Center for e-learning. International Institute of Professional Training(IIPT). The project focuses on the Professional Training & Development of an individual to make them ready for work. eKalam founded in 2018, the eKalam aims to become an international leader in the research, development and implementation of e-learning architecture and infrastructure using open standards.

Certified Professional Course - Registered by MHRD 

 the Tajseer initiative is part of the National Center for E-learning & Distance learning (NCeDL), under the guidance of the Ministry of Higher Education, overall complementary strategy, which was designed to help developing the tradition ways of teaching and learning to become more advanced through the use of technology. The initiative, therefore, focuses on supporting higher education institutions and prepares them to implement the most recent technologies and applications available in the field of E-learning and distance learning.
Ethical Hacking Course.
Data Analtucs Course 
Cyber Secuity Training 

is an LMS designed by the National Center of E-learning and Distance Learning in order to manage the E-Learning process in the kingdom of Saudi Arabia.
ePortal:
eKalam
 Excellence Award: is an award from the National Center to creative projects by higher education staff related to and concerning e-Learning and distance learning. 
Maknaz: National Repository for Learning Objbyects
Taiseer: is a service provided from the National Center to encourage the university staff to use Jusur by providing and simplifying the use of Jusur and all its services.

India, MHRD

Distance education institutions based in Saudi Arabia